Frans Thijssen (born 23 January 1952) is a Dutch former footballer. He started his professional career in 1970 with NEC Nijmegen. In 1973, he moved to FC Twente, where the midfielder played for nearly six seasons.

Thijssen won fourteen caps for Holland between 1975 and 1981.

In 1979, he moved to England to sign for Ipswich Town joining former FC Twente teammate Arnold Mühren. In 1981 he was the first Dutchman to be voted English Footballer of the Year as he helped Ipswich Town win the UEFA Cup, scoring one goal in each of the two legs of the final. He played a big part in their run to the semi finals of the FA Cup, and they also finished second in the league that season. He helped them finish second again the following year, but a year later he departed from Portman Road after four years to sign for Brian Clough's Nottingham Forest, but he was not nearly as successful at the City Ground as he had been in East Anglia, and he had left the club within months.

He also had a stint in the NASL with the Vancouver Whitecaps. In 1984, he returned to his native country, to play for Fortuna Sittard (1984–1987), FC Groningen (1987–1988) and Vitesse Arnhem (1988–1991).

After his active career he became a football manager. In 1997, he became manager for the Swedish club Malmö FF and spent two years there.

After several seasons without success, Thijssen was sacked as manager for Malmö FF during the middle of season 1998. At the time of his dismissal Malmö was in danger of being relegated to the first division (Superettan) for the first time in the club's history. Thijssen was replaced by Roland Andersson and Thomas Sjöberg.

On 24 November 2014, Thijssen was named interim coach of the Brisbane Roar in the Australian A-League.

Managerial statistics

Honours
FC Twente
KNVB Cup: 1976–77

Ipswich Town
UEFA Cup: 1980–81

Vitesse Arnhem
Eerste Divisie: 1988–89

Individual
Ipswich Town Player of the Year: 1979–80
 Football League First Division PFA Team of the Year: 1980–81
Football Writers' Association Footballer of the Year 1980–81
Eerste Divisie Player of the Year: 1987–88
Ipswich Town Hall of Fame: Inducted 2008

References

External links

 Dutch Players Abroad site for Thijssen
 Profile

1952 births
Living people
People from Heumen
Dutch footballers
Netherlands international footballers
Dutch football managers
North American Soccer League (1968–1984) players
Vancouver Whitecaps (1974–1984) players
Ipswich Town F.C. players
Fortuna Sittard players
NEC Nijmegen players
Nottingham Forest F.C. players
FC Twente players
FC Groningen players
SBV Vitesse players
Eredivisie players
Eerste Divisie players
English Football League players
Dutch expatriate footballers
Expatriate footballers in England
Dutch expatriate sportspeople in England
Expatriate soccer players in Canada
Dutch expatriate sportspeople in Canada
SBV Vitesse managers
De Graafschap managers
Malmö FF managers
Expatriate football managers in Sweden
Dutch expatriate sportspeople in Sweden
Al-Wakrah SC managers
Fortuna Sittard managers
Qatar SC managers
UEFA Euro 1980 players
Association football midfielders
UEFA Cup winning players
Juliana '31 players
Expatriate soccer managers in Australia
A-League Men managers
Brisbane Roar FC managers
Footballers from Gelderland
Dutch expatriate sportspeople in Australia